The Conservative Reformed Presbyterian Church in Korea(예장보수개혁총회) was founded in 1980 by Pastor Oh Gyun-Yul(오균열). It subscribes to the Apostles Creed and the Westminster Confession. Membership was 7,687 in 126 congregations served by 129 pastors in 2004.

References

Presbyterian denominations in South Korea